Ossonoba is a monotypic moth genus in the family Erebidae. Its only species, Ossonoba torpida, is found in Darjeeling, India. Both the genus and the species were first described by Francis Walker in 1866.

References

Scoliopteryginae
Monotypic moth genera